WSC Real 08: World Snooker Championship is a sports video game developed by Blade Interactive and published by Koch Media exclusively for Wii. It was later released for Microsoft Windows, PlayStation 3 and Xbox 360 under the name WSC Real 09: World Snooker Championship.

Gameplay 
The game includes new elements, which makes the game seem more realistic. Players will be able to switch into a first-person view, allowing them to walk around the table and examine any ball they wish, they can carefully watch their opponents' body language to see how they respond as the game progresses. The game includes all the tournaments and official licenses for the season.

The original Wii release was shipped with a cue attachment, which allowed the player to control the game with the Wiimote acting as a cue to play shots in game.

Features

Players 
 Mark Allen
 Jamie Cope
 Joe Perry
 Joe Swail
 John Higgins
 Graeme Dott
 Shaun Murphy
 Ken Doherty
 Ronnie O'Sullivan
 Peter Ebdon
 Neil Robertson
 Stephen Hendry
 Ding Junhui
 Stephen Maguire
 Mark Selby
 Mark Williams
and others..

Tournaments 
 Shanghai Masters
 Pot Black
 Grand Prix
 Northern Ireland Trophy
 UK Snooker Championship
 Masters
 China Open
 Welsh Open
 World Snooker Championship

Commentators 
 John Virgo
 Steve Davis
 John Parrott

Reception 
The Wii version of the game was also highly rated on GameRankings, scoring 89%. However, The WSC Real 09 version of the game, the later release on the Xbox 360, PS3 and PC formats, did not fare quite so well, achieving an average of 70% at GameRankings.

Official Nintendo Magazine UK gave the Wii version 89/100, saying "You won't find many better sports games on the Wii."

In a review of the Xbox version, Computer and Video Games praised its realistic ball physics and challenging AI, and called it the "most authentic snooker game to date". However, the reviewer criticized its loading times, underwhelming presentation, and minor camera issues.

References

External links

2008 video games
Deep Silver games
Europe-exclusive video games
Plaion
PlayStation 3 games
2008
Video games developed in the United Kingdom
Wii games
Windows games
Xbox 360 games